Jasimuddin is a Bangladeshi cricketer. He made his first-class debut for Chittagong Division in the 2001–02 National Cricket League.

References

External links
 

Year of birth missing (living people)
Living people
Bangladeshi cricketers
Chittagong Division cricketers
Place of birth missing (living people)